Riverside High School may refer to:

United States (by state)
Riverside High School (Lake City, Arkansas)
Riverside Polytechnic High School, Riverside, California 
Riverside High School (Florida), Jacksonville, Florida
Riverside Brookfield High School, Riverside, Illinois
Riverside High School, in Oakland, Iowa
Riverside High School (Mississippi), Avon, Mississippi 
Riverside High School (New Jersey), Riverside, New Jersey
Riverside High School (Buffalo, New York)
Riverside High School (Durham, North Carolina)
Riverside High School (Williamston, North Carolina)
Riverside High School (De Graff, Ohio)
Riverside High School (Painesville, Ohio)
Riverside High School (Albany, Oregon)
Riverside Junior/Senior High School (Boardman, Oregon)
Riverside High School, in Riverside Beaver County School District, Ellwood City, Pennsylvania
Riverside Junior/Senior High School (Taylor, Pennsylvania)
Riverside High School (South Carolina), Greer, South Carolina
Riverside High School, in Decaturville, Tennessee
Amon Carter Riverside High School, Fort Worth, Texas
Riverside High School (El Paso, Texas)
Riverside High School (Loudoun County, Virginia), Lansdowne, Virginia; postal address Leesburg, Virginia
Auburn Riverside High School, Auburn, Washington
Riverside High School, in Chattaroy, Washington
Riverside High School (West Virginia), Quincy, West Virginia; postal address Belle, West Virginia
Riverside University High School, Milwaukee, Wisconsin
Riverside High School (Wyoming), Basin, Wyoming

Other (by country)
Riverside Girls High School, Sydney, New South Wales, Australia
Riverside High School (Launceston), Launceston, Tasmania, Australia
Riverside Secondary School (Windsor, Ontario), Windsor, Ontario, Canada
Riverside High School, Vereeniging, Gauteng, South Africa